Ron Elisha (born 1951) is an Israeli-born Australian playwright, writer and general practitioner.

Born in Jerusalem Ron Elisha's family moved to Melbourne, Australia in 1953. In 1975 he graduated in Medicine from Melbourne University and has practised as a GP since then. His first play, In Duty Bound was staged in 1979. Since then he has written dozens of plays, two children's books and occasional pieces for newspapers. He has won four Australian Writers' Guild Awards, including the Major Award in 1982 for his 1981 play Einstein.  His plays have also been shortlisted for multiple awards throughout Australia, Europe and the US, his work having been produced throughout Australia, New Zealand, United States, United Kingdom, Canada, Poland, Israel France, Belgium, Italy and Portugal.

Bibliography 
Drama
 In Duty Bound. (Yackandandah, 1983) 
 Two. (Currency, 1985) 
 Einstein. (Penguin/Yackandandah, 1986) 
 The Levine comedy. (Yackandandah, 1987) 
 Safe House. (Currency Press, 1989) 
 Esterhaz. (Currency Press, 1990) 
 Pax Americana. (Yackandandah, 1990) 
 Choice. (Currency Press, 1994) 
 The Goldberg Variations. (Currency Press, 2000) 
 A Tree, Fallng (Australian Script Centre, 2003, online)
 Wrongful Life (Australian Script Centre, 2005, online)
 Controlled Crying  (Australian Script Centre, 2006, online)
 Renaissance (Australian Script Centre, 2006, online)
 The Schelling Point (Australian Script Centre, 2010, online)
 "Man In The Middle" (Australian Script Centre, 2012, online)
 "Love Field" (Australian Script Centre, 2013, online)
 "The Soul Of Wittgenstein" 2016 (Australian Script Centre, 2016, online)
 "Certificate Of Life" 2017 (Australian Script Centre, 2017, online)
 "Window" 2017 (Australian Script Centre, 2018, online)
 "Unsolicited Male"  2018 (Australian Script Centre, 2019, online)
 "I Really Don't Care"  2019 (Australian Script Centre, 2019, online)
 "21 Down"  2019 (Australian Script Centre, 2019, online)
 "Falling In Love Again"  2020
 "Donating Felix"  2020
 "Everyman & His Dog"  2022

Children's books
 Pigtales. (Random House, 1994) 
 Too Big. (Random House, 1997) 

Teleplays
 "Death Duties" (part of Six Pack anthology series, BS TV, 1991)

References

External links 
 Life after medicine essay
 The thin line essay
 Reviev of Two

1951 births
Australian children's writers
Australian general practitioners
Australian dramatists and playwrights
Israeli emigrants to Australia
Israeli Jews
Jewish Australian writers
Jewish dramatists and playwrights
Living people
Medical doctors from Melbourne
Writers from Jerusalem
Writers from Melbourne
Jewish physicians